The CSIO Spruce Meadows' 'Masters' Tournament is an annual fall equestrian show jumping event held at Spruce Meadows in Calgary, Alberta, presented by Rolex . It is highlighted by the BMO Financial Group Nations' Cup which offers a C$350,000 purse and is notable as the "richest team show jumping event in the world", as well as by the million-dollar CN International.

Total purse amounts for the Spruce Meadows 'Masters' amount to over $2 million, making it one of the richest show jumping events in the world.

Historically, Great Britain currently holds more Nation's Cup titles at Spruce Meadows than any other nation with 10 victories out of the past 29.  The 2006 victory by Canada marks the first time the home team has won a nation's cup at the Masters Tournament.

BMO Financial Group Nation's Cup Past Winners

* Denotes win by jump-off with the bracketed numbers indicating faults taken during jump-off
 The 2005 competition failed to yield results due to heavy rains.

2006 Nation's Cup Results

Despite taking only a mere six faults up to the final round, Great Britain created a jump-off situation during their final ride as their squad gained four faults to equal Canada's ten.  The competition then culminated in a thrilling jump-off between the two teams as anchor riders Michael Whitaker and Ian Millar were selected to represent their respective teams.  Despite faulting for the first time that day, it was Canada's Ian Millar riding eleven-year-old gelding In Style who ensured Canada's first victory at this tournament.  Taking the bronze was United States' national team, who rode strongly; taking only sixteen faults.  The remaining rankings saw Germany take fourth place, the Netherlands achieving fifth place, and Belgium finishing in sixth.

Despite fairly warm temperatures and windy afternoon showers, attendance at the 2006 Nation's cup final held Saturday, September 9, approximated 60 870; a single day record for Spruce Meadows.

Masters Grand Prix
The Masters tournament culminates with one of the top Grands Prix in the world of show jumping: the $1 Million CN International Grand Prix (formerly known as the du Maurier Limited International Grand Prix)

CP International Grand Prix Past Winners  
2022 Daniel Deusser  and Killer Queen
2021 Steve Guerdat  and Venard de Cerisy
2020 Not run due to Covid-19 
2019 Beezie Madden   and  Darry Lou
2018 Sameh El Dahan  and  Suma's Zorro
2017 Philipp Weishaupt  and  LB Convall
2016 Scott Brash  and Hello Ursula XII
2015 Scott Brash  and Hello Sanctos
2014 Ian Millar  and Dixson
2013 Pieter Devos  and Candy
2012 Olivier Philippaerts  and Cabrio Van De Heffinck
2011 Eric Lamaze  and Hickstead
2010 Jeroen Dubbeldam  and Simon
2009 McLain Ward  and Sapphire
2008 Nick Skelton  and Arko III
2007 Eric Lamaze  and Hickstead
2006 Eugenie Angot  and Cigale du Tallis	
2005 Beezie Madden  and  Judgement		
2004 Jos Lansink  and Cumano	
2003 Otto Becker  and Dobels Cento
2002 Ludger Beerbaum  and  Goldfever 3	
2001 Rodrigo Pessoa  and Gandini Lianos	
2000 Rodrigo Pessoa  and Gandini Lianos	
1999 Rene Tebbel  and Radiator		
1998 Nick Skelton  and  Virtual Village Hopes Are High	
1997 Leslie Burr-Howard  and S'Blieft		
1996 Peter Charles  and La Ina		
1995 Michael Whitaker  and Everest Two-Step	
1994 John Whitaker  and Everest Grannusch	
1993 Nick Skelton  and Everest Dollar Girl	
1992 John Whitaker  and Henderson Gammon	
1991 Ian Millar  and Big Ben
1990 Otto Becker  and Optibeurs Pamina	
1989 Michael Whitaker  and Next Mon Santa
1988 George Morris  and Rio	
1987 Ian Millar  and Big Ben
1986 John Whitaker  and Next Milton		
1985 Nick Skelton  and Everest St. James	
1984 Heidi Robbiani  and Jessica V	
1983 Norman Dello Joio  and I Love You		
1982 Malcolm Pyrah  and Towerlands Anglezarke	
1981 David Broome  and Queens Way Philco
1980 Rob Ehrens  and Koh i Noor
1979 Eddie Macken  and Carroll's Boomerang
1978 Caroline Bradley  and Tigre
1977 John Simpson  and Texas
1976 Michael Vaillancourt  and Branch County

* Results courtesy of the Spruce Meadows secretary.

References